The Gosper curve, named after Bill Gosper, also known as the Peano-Gosper Curve and the flowsnake (a spoonerism of snowflake), is a space-filling curve whose limit set is rep-7.  It is a fractal curve similar in its construction to the dragon curve and the Hilbert curve.

The Gosper curve can also be used for efficient hierarchical hexagonal clustering and indexing.

Algorithm

Lindenmayer system 
The Gosper curve can be represented using an L-system with rules as follows:
 Angle: 60°
 Axiom: 
 Replacement rules:
 
 
In this case both A and B mean to move forward, + means to turn left 60 degrees and - means to turn right 60 degrees - using a "turtle"-style program such as Logo.

Logo 
A Logo program to draw the Gosper curve using turtle graphics:
to rg :st :ln
 make "st :st - 1
 make "ln :ln / sqrt 7
 if :st > 0 [rg :st :ln rt 60 gl :st :ln  rt 120 gl :st :ln lt 60 rg :st :ln lt 120 rg :st :ln rg :st :ln lt 60 gl :st :ln rt 60]
 if :st = 0 [fd :ln rt 60 fd :ln rt 120 fd :ln lt 60 fd :ln lt 120 fd :ln fd :ln lt 60 fd :ln rt 60]
end
 
to gl :st :ln
 make "st :st - 1
 make "ln :ln / sqrt 7
 if :st > 0 [lt 60 rg :st :ln rt 60 gl :st :ln gl :st :ln rt 120 gl :st :ln rt 60 rg :st :ln lt 120 rg :st :ln lt 60 gl :st :ln]
 if :st = 0 [lt 60 fd :ln rt 60 fd :ln fd :ln rt 120 fd :ln rt 60 fd :ln lt 120 fd :ln lt 60 fd :ln]
end

The program can be invoked, for example, with rg 4 300, or alternatively gl 4 300.

Python 
A Python program, that uses the aforementioned L-System rules, to draw the Gosper curve using turtle graphics (online version):

import turtle

def gosper_curve(order: int, size: int, is_A: bool = True) -> None:
    """Draw the Gosper curve."""
    if order == 0:
        turtle.forward(size)
        return
    for op in "A-B--B+A++AA+B-" if is_A else "+A-BB--B-A++A+B":
        gosper_op_map[op](order - 1, size)

gosper_op_map = {
    "A": lambda o, size: gosper_curve(o, size, True),
    "B": lambda o, size: gosper_curve(o, size, False),
    "-": lambda o, size: turtle.right(60),
    "+": lambda o, size: turtle.left(60),
}
size = 10
order = 3
gosper_curve(order, size)

Properties 
The space filled by the curve is called the Gosper island. The first few iterations of it are shown below:

The Gosper Island can tile the plane. As can be seen from the diagram below, performing this operation with an intermediate iteration of the island leads to a scaled-up version of the next iteration. Repeating this process indefinitely produces a tessellation of the plane. The curve itself can likewise be extended to an infinite curve filling the whole plane.

See also 
 List of fractals by Hausdorff dimension
 M.C. Escher

References

External links 
NEW GOSPER SPACE FILLING CURVES
FRACTAL DE GOSPER (in French)
Gosper Island at Wolfram MathWorld
Flowsnake by R. William Gosper

Fractal curves